Karzuiyeh (also Romanized as Kārzū’īyeh) is a village in Rabor Rural District, in the Central District of Rabor County, Kerman Province, Iran. At the 2006 census, its population was 58, in 13 families.

References 

Populated places in Rabor County